Microgale is a genus of mammal in the family Tenrecidae. There are 21 living species on the island of Madagascar and one extinct species known from a fossil. Some species have been discovered in the last twenty years.

On the basis of molecular data indicating that Talazac's shrew tenrec and Dobson's shrew tenrec form a sister group to the rest of Microgale, these two species were transferred from Microgale to Nesogale in 2016. Nesogale and Microgale are estimated to have diverged about 19 million years ago, during the Early Miocene. The web-footed tenrec, M.  mergulus, the only semiaquatic member of the genus, was formerly placed in the monotypic genus Limnogale, but was moved in 2016 on the basis of sequence data showing it to be deeply nested within Microgale.

Microgale contains the following extant species:
Short-tailed shrew tenrec (M. brevicaudata) – G. Grandidier, 1899
Cowan's shrew tenrec (M. cowani) – Thomas, 1882
Drouhard's shrew tenrec (M. drouhardi) – Grandidier, 1934
Dryad shrew tenrec (M. dryas) - Jenkins, 1992
Pale shrew tenrec (M. fotsifotsy) – Jenkins, Raxworthy & Nussbaum, 1997
Gracile shrew tenrec (M. gracilis) – (Major, 1896)
Grandidier's shrew tenrec (M. grandidieri) - Olson et al., 2009
Naked-nosed shrew tenrec (M. gymnorhyncha) - Jenkins et al., 1996
Jenkins's shrew tenrec (M. jenkinsae) - Goodman & Soarimalala, 2004
Northern shrew tenrec (M. jobihely) - Goodman, Raxworthy, Maminirina & Olson, 2006
Lesser long-tailed shrew tenrec (M. longicaudata) - Thomas, 1882
Major's long-tailed tenrec (M. majori) - Thomas, 1918
Web-footed tenrec (M. mergulus) - (Major, 1896)
Montane shrew tenrec (M. monticola) - Goodman & Jenkins, 1998
Nasolo's shrew tenrec (M. nasoloi) - Jenkins & Goodman, 1999
Pygmy shrew tenrec (M. parvula) - G. Grandidier, 1934
Greater long-tailed shrew tenrec (M. principula) - Thomas, 1926
Least shrew tenrec (M. pusilla) - Major, 1896
Shrew-toothed shrew tenrec (M. soricoides) - Jenkins, 1993
Taiva shrew tenrec (M. taiva) - Major, 1896
Thomas's shrew tenrec (M. thomasi) - Major, 1896

Shrew tenrecs converged on the shrew like  body plan these animals also share the same diversity as shrews with web footed tenrecs closely resembling water shrews.

Extinct species
Microgale macpheei - subfossil from southeastern Madagascar

References

Afrosoricida
Mammal genera
Taxa named by Oldfield Thomas
Taxonomy articles created by Polbot